The individual dressage event, part of the equestrian program at the 1996 Summer Olympics, was held from 26 July to 3 August 1996, at the Georgia International Horse Park, in Conyers, Georgia.  Like all other equestrian events, the dressage competition was mixed gender, with both male and female athletes competing in the same division.  48 horse and rider pairs were entered, with round one scores from team event.

Medalists

Results

Grand Prix Test
Top 25 riders advanced to round two. 
Held 26 and 27 July. 
The first round was the Grand Prix Test.  Each of the 48 pairs went through a series of movements in the sandy arena, with judges in five different positions observing the movements and giving percentage scores based on the execution of the movements.  The total score for the round was the average of the five judges' scores.  The top 25 pairs advanced to the second round.

Grand Prix Special 2nd Qualifier
Held 31 July. 
The second round was the Grand Prix Special 2nd Qualifier. It was similar to the first, though the time allotted was shorter.  The score from this round was added to the score from the Grand Prix Test. The top 14 pairs advanced to the final.

Grand Prix Freestyle
Held 3 August. The final round of dressage competition was the Grand Prix Freestyle Test.  Fifteen pairs competed in this round, in which they designed their own program of movements set to music.  They were judged on both execution of the movements (technical) and how well their performance matched the music (artistic).  Each of the five judges gave a score from 0 to 10 in both categories, with the final score for the round being the sum of those ten scores.  This score was then added to the scores from the other two rounds to determine final ranking.

Final rankings

References

Sources
 Official Report of the 1996 Atlanta Summer Olympics available at  https://web.archive.org/web/20060622162855/http://www.la84foundation.org/5va/reports_frmst.htm

Equestrian at the 1996 Summer Olympics